Polyporivora is a genus of flat-footed flies (insects in the family Platypezidae). There are about eight described species in Polyporivora.

Species
These eight species belong to the genus Polyporivora:
Polyporivora amurensis Shatalkin, 1981 c g
Polyporivora boletina (Fallén, 1815) c g
Polyporivora canomela Chandler, 1980
Polyporivora hunteri (Kessel, 1959)
Polyporivora nepalensis (Kessel, 1966)
Polyporivora ornata (Meigen, 1838) c g
Polyporivora picta (Meigen, 1830)
Polyporivora polypori (Willard, 1914)
Data sources: i = ITIS, c = Catalogue of Life, g = GBIF, b = Bugguide.net

References

Further reading

External links

 

Platypezidae
Articles created by Qbugbot
Platypezoidea genera